Harrah's Metropolis is a riverboat casino located on the Ohio River in Metropolis, Illinois. It opened in 1994 as Players Island, a joint venture between Players International and show business impresario Merv Griffin as one of the state's first casinos. The property became part of Harrah's Entertainment (later Caesars Entertainment) with its 2000 acquisition of Players International.

In 2014, Harrah's was given permission from the Illinois Gaming Board to move its gaming floor from its riverboat to the property's convention center.  Illinois law requires that gambling floors be over water, but does not require that they be located on a navigable river. This was achieved by installing water bladders underneath the building. In October 2017, ownership was transferred to Vici Properties as part of a corporate spin-off, and the property was leased back to Caesars.

Harrah's Metropolis includes a casino with more than 800 slot machines and 25 table games, a hotel with 258 rooms, a showroom, and five restaurants.

See also  
List of Caesars Entertainment properties
List of casinos in Illinois

References

External links 
 Harrah's Metropolis website

Casinos in Illinois
Caesars Entertainment
Buildings and structures in Massac County, Illinois
Hotel buildings completed in 1994
Riverboat casinos
Tourist attractions in Massac County, Illinois
1994 establishments in Illinois